Jewel Concert Tour is the third live CD by singer Beni. The album was released on 25 January 2012 along with her single "Eien". The DVD contains footage of the concert on 10 July 2011 in the Tokyo Dome City Hall.

Track list: DVD

Track list: CD

Charts

References

Beni (singer) albums
2012 live albums
2012 video albums
Live video albums